The first cabinet of Prime Minister Václav Klaus was in power from 2 July 1992 to 4 July 1996. The Czech Republic became an independent sovereign state on 1 January 1993 and thus this government was the first one after the dissolution of Czechoslovakia. It consisted of Civic Democratic Party (ODS), Christian and Democratic Union – Czechoslovak People's Party (KDU-ČSL), Civic Democratic Alliance (ODA) and Christian Democratic Party (KDS).

Government ministers

Notes 
 1 In office from January 1993 to 22 September 1994
 2 In office from 10 October 1995 to 4 July 1996
 3 In office from 22 September 1994 to 4 July 1996
 4 In office from 2 July 1992 to 17 January 1994
 5 In office from 2 July 1992 to 22 June 1993
 6 In office from 2 May 1994 to 4 July 1996
 7 In office from 2 July 1992 to 27 April 1994
 8 In office from 23 June 1993 to 10 October 1995
 9 In office from 10 October 1995 to 4 July 1996
 10 In office from 19 January 1994 to 4 July 1996

Czech government cabinets
Civic Democratic Party (Czech Republic)
KDU-ČSL
Václav Klaus
Civic Democratic Alliance
Coalition governments of the Czech Republic
Cabinets established in 1992
Cabinets disestablished in 1996